Gulf of Tehuantepec is a large body of water on the Pacific coast of the Isthmus of Tehuantepec, southeastern Mexico, at .  Many (but not all) Pacific hurricanes form in or near this body of water.  A strong, gale-force wind called the Tehuano periodically blows out over the waters of the Gulf of Tehuantepec, inducing strong upwelling of nutrient-rich waters which support abundant sea life.

The gulf is in the path of the lowest landform between Mexico and Northern Central America, allowing unhindered wind passage from the Gulf of Mexico, and the Eastern Pacific Ocean.

Gulfs of Mexico
Tehuantepec
Landforms of Oaxaca